Daegwallyeong-myeon is a myeon (township) in the county of Pyeongchang in the province of Gangwon-do, South Korea. It is located in the northeastern part of the county. The myeon was named Doam-myeon until 2007. Daegwallyeong-myeon is named after the important mountain pass of Daegwallyeong. It has the coldest average temperature in South Korea.

Climate

Attractions 
Yongpyong Ski Resort: largest ski resort in South Korea, venue of 2018 Winter Olympics  
Alpensia Resort: main venue of 2018 Winter Olympics
Daegwallyeong Sheep Farm
Pyeongchang Olympic Stadium: venue for the opening and closing ceremonies of the 2018 Winter Olympics.

References

External links 
Official Homepage

Pyeongchang County
Towns and townships in Gangwon Province, South Korea